Matteo Piano (born 24 October 1990) is an Italian volleyball player, a member of Italy men's national volleyball team and Revivre Milano. Matteo Piano has a standing reach of 209 cm. He was silver medalist at the 2016 Olympics and the 2015 World Cup, silver medalist at the European Championship 2013, and bronze medalist of the World League (2013, 2014).

Career

National team
He debuted with the Italy men's national volleyball team in 2013. In 2013 Italy, including Piano, won bronze medal of World League. In the same year he achieved silver medal of European Championship. In 2014 he and his Italian teammates won bronze of World League held in Florence, Italy. He was also part of the team that won the silver medal in the 2016 Summer Olympics and in the 2017 FIVB Volleyball Men's World Grand Champions Cup.

Sporting achievements

Clubs

National championships
 2014/2015  Italian Cup, with Modena Volley
 2015/2016  Italian Cup, with DHL Modena

National team
 2013  FIVB World League
 2013  CEV European Championship
 2014  FIVB World League
 2015  FIVB World Cup
 2016  Olympic Games

Individual
 2017 FIVB World Grand Champions Cup – Best Middle Blocker

References

External links
FIVB profile
LegaVolley player profile

1990 births
Living people
People from Asti
Italian men's volleyball players
Modena Volley players
Olympic volleyball players of Italy
Volleyball players at the 2016 Summer Olympics
Medalists at the 2016 Summer Olympics
Olympic silver medalists for Italy
Olympic medalists in volleyball
Volleyball players at the 2020 Summer Olympics
Middle blockers
Sportspeople from the Province of Asti